Panagiotis Grammatikopoulos (born 17 May 1959) is a Greek weightlifter. He competed in the men's middleweight event at the 1992 Summer Olympics.

References

1959 births
Living people
Greek male weightlifters
Olympic weightlifters of Greece
Weightlifters at the 1992 Summer Olympics
Place of birth missing (living people)